Black Radio 3 (stylized as BLACK RADIO III) is an album by American musician Robert Glasper. It was released on February 25, 2022, via Loma Vista Recordings, serving as the follow-ups to 2012's Black Radio and 2013's Black Radio 2. It was produced by Glasper along with co-producers Terrace Martin, Bryan-Michael Cox and Jahi Sundance, and mixed by Qmillion. 

The album features a host of guest appearances from Amir Sulaiman, Ant Clemons, Big K.R.I.T., BJ the Chicago Kid, Common, D Smoke, Esperanza Spalding, Gregory Porter, H.E.R., India.Arie, Jennifer Hudson, Killer Mike, Lalah Hathaway, Ledisi, Meshell Ndegeocello, Musiq Soulchild, PJ Morton, Posdnuos, Q-Tip, Tiffany Gouché, Ty Dolla $ign and Yebba.

The album marked a commercial decline in the Black Radio Series, after it failed to chart on the Billboard 200. However, it received favorable reviews from music critics. At the 65th Grammy Awards, it was nominated for Best Engineered Album, Non-Classical, and won Best R&B Album.

Critical reception

Track listing

Notes
Track 2 contains spoken words from Christian Scott aTunde Adjuah and voices of Josephine Hodge and Riley Glasper.

Charts

References

External links 

2022 albums
Sequel albums
Robert Glasper albums
Loma Vista Recordings albums
Albums produced by Terrace Martin
Grammy Award for Best R&B Album